The Vancouver Royals were a Canadian professional soccer team based in Vancouver, British Columbia, Canada.  Founded in 1967 as the Vancouver Royal Canadians, they were a charter member of the United Soccer Association (USA), and when the USA and rival National Professional Soccer League (NPSL) merged in 1968 to form the North American Soccer League (NASL), the team, rebranded as the Royals, moved to the new league. The Royals played its home matches at the Empire Stadium. The team folded at the conclusion of the 1968 NASL season.

History
In 1966 several groups of entrepreneurs were exploring the idea of forming a professional soccer league in United States. One of these groups, United Soccer Association (USA) led by Jack Kent Cooke, selected 12 cities for team locations  with Vancouver franchise purchased by Brigadier General E.G. Eakins. The USA originally planned to start play in the spring of 1968; however the rival National Professional Soccer League, which secured a TV contract from CBS, announced it was ready to launch in 1967. Not wanting to let the rival league gain an advantage, the USA decided to launch early. Not having secured any player contracts, the league imported teams from Europe, Brazil, and Uruguay to represent the franchise cities.  English team Sunderland A.F.C. was brought in to play as the Royal Canadians.

The Royals opened the 1967 season away against the San Francisco Golden Gate Gales with a 6–1 loss on May 28, but won their home opener against the Dallas Tornado 4–1 on June 7.  The Royals finished the season in fifth place with a record of 3 wins, 5 ties and 4 losses while drawing an average home league attendance of 7,019.

Following the 1967 season, the USA merged with the National Professional Soccer League to form the North American Soccer League.  As part of the new league's efforts to consolidate teams and cites, the owner of the San Francisco Golden Gate Gales franchise, George Fleharty, yielded the San Francisco Bay Area to the NPSL Oakland Clippers and bought a controlling interest in the Vancouver Royal Canadians, renaming the team Vancouver Royals.  Bobby Robson was originally reported to have been named manager of the new merged team which was to include players both the Royals and Gales organizations had signed between the end of the 1967 season and merger.  However, Ferenc Puskás who had been hired to manage the San Francisco franchise was later named by the owner as head coach. Robson, who took over as coach of Fulham F.C. in January 1968, later sued the team for breach of contract.

The Royals finished the 1968 NASL season in last place in the Pacific Division with 12 wins 5 ties and 15 losses.  The team averaged a home attendance of 6,197.  The Royals were one of 12 teams that folded between the 1968 and 1969 NASL seasons.

Coaches
 Ian McColl (1967)
  Ferenc Puskás, Head Coach (1968)
 Joe Csabai, Assistant Coach (1968)

Year-by-year

Note: Only regular season goals counted

See also
1967 Vancouver Royal Canadians season
1968 Vancouver Royals season
Vancouver Whitecaps

Notes

External links
 Team stats

References 

 
Defunct soccer clubs in Canada
North American Soccer League (1968–1984) teams
North American Soccer League (1968–1984) teams based in Canada
Royals
United Soccer Association franchises
1967 establishments in British Columbia
1968 disestablishments in British Columbia